The City of Purple Dreams may refer to:

 The City of Purple Dreams (1918 film), a silent American film directed by Colin Campbell 
 The City of Purple Dreams (1928 film), a silent American film directed by Duke Worne